In Italy, municipalities (comuni) are the basic administrative division, and may be properly approximated in casual speech by the English word township or municipality.

Overall
 Alphabetical list of municipalities of Italy

Central Italy

Lazio
 List of municipalities of the Province of Frosinone
 List of municipalities of the Province of Latina
 List of municipalities of the Province of Rieti
 List of municipalities of the Metropolitan City of Capital Rome
 List of municipalities of the Province of Viterbo

Marche
 List of municipalities of the Province of Ancona
 List of municipalities of the Province of Ascoli Piceno
 List of municipalities of the Province of Fermo
 List of municipalities of the Province of Macerata
 List of municipalities of the Province of Pesaro and Urbino

Tuscany
 List of municipalities of the Province of Arezzo
 List of municipalities of the Metropolitan City of Florence
 List of municipalities of the Province of Grosseto
 List of municipalities of the Province of Livorno
 List of municipalities of the Province of Lucca
 List of municipalities of the Province of Massa-Carrara
 List of municipalities of the Province of Pisa
 List of municipalities of the Province of Pistoia
 List of municipalities of the Province of Prato
 List of municipalities of the Province of Siena

Umbria
 List of municipalities of the Province of Perugia
 List of municipalities of the Province of Terni

Insular Italy

Sardinia
 List of municipalities of the Metropolitan City of Cagliari
 List of municipalities of the Province of Carbonia-Iglesias (former)
 List of municipalities of the Province of Medio Campidano (former)
 List of municipalities of the Province of Nuoro
 List of municipalities of the Province of Ogliastra (former)
 List of municipalities of the Province of Olbia-Tempio (former)
 List of municipalities of the Province of Oristano
 List of municipalities of the Province of Sassari
 List of municipalities of the Province of South Sardinia

Sicily
 List of municipalities of the Province of Agrigento
 List of municipalities of the Province of Caltanissetta
 List of municipalities of the Metropolitan City of Catania
 List of municipalities of the Province of Enna
 List of municipalities of the Metropolitan City of Messina
 List of municipalities of the Metropolitan City of Palermo
 List of municipalities of the Province of Ragusa
 List of municipalities of the Province of Syracuse
 List of municipalities of the Province of Trapani

North Eastern Italy

Emilia-Romagna
 List of municipalities of the Metropolitan City of Bologna
 List of municipalities of the Province of Ferrara
 List of municipalities of the Province of Forlì-Cesena
 List of municipalities of the Province of Modena
 List of municipalities of the Province of Parma
 List of municipalities of the Province of Piacenza
 List of municipalities of the Province of Ravenna
 List of municipalities of the Province of Reggio Emilia
 List of municipalities of the Province of Rimini

Friuli-Venezia Giulia
 List of municipalities of the Province of Gorizia
 List of municipalities of the Province of Pordenone
 List of municipalities of the Province of Trieste
 List of municipalities of the Province of Udine

Trentino-Alto Adige/Südtirol
 List of municipalities of the Province of South Tyrol
 List of municipalities of the Province of Trentino

Veneto
 List of municipalities of the Province of Belluno
 List of municipalities of the Province of Padua
 List of municipalities of the Province of Rovigo
 List of municipalities of the Province of Treviso
 List of municipalities of the Metropolitan City of Venice
 List of municipalities of the Province of Verona
 List of municipalities of the Province of Vicenza

North Western Italy

Aosta Valley
 List of municipalities of the Aosta Valley

Liguria
 List of municipalities of the Metropolitan City of Genoa
 List of municipalities of the Province of Imperia
 List of municipalities of the Province of La Spezia
 List of municipalities of the Province of Savona

Lombardy
 List of municipalities of the Province of Bergamo
 List of municipalities of the Province of Brescia
 List of municipalities of the Province of Como
 List of municipalities of the Province of Cremona
 List of municipalities of the Province of Lecco
 List of municipalities of the Province of Lodi
 List of municipalities of the Province of Mantua
 List of municipalities of the Metropolitan City of Milan
 List of municipalities of the Province of Monza and Brianza
 List of municipalities  of the Province of Pavia
 List of municipalities of the Province of Sondrio
 List of municipalities of the Province of Varese

Piedmont
 List of municipalities of the Province of Alessandria
 List of municipalities of the Province of Asti
 List of municipalities of the Province of Biella
 List of municipalities of the Province of Cuneo
 List of municipalities of the Province of Novara
 List of municipalities of the Metropolitan City of Turin
 List of municipalities of the Province of Verbano-Cusio-Ossola
 List of municipalities of the Province of Vercelli

Southern Italy

Abruzzo
 List of municipalities of the Province of Chieti
 List of municipalities of the Province of L'Aquila
 List of municipalities of the Province of Pescara
 List of municipalities of the Province of Teramo

Apulia
 List of municipalities of the Metropolitan City of Bari
 List of municipalities of the Province of Barletta-Andria-Trani
 List of municipalities of the Province of Brindisi
 List of municipalities of the Province of Foggia
 List of municipalities of the Province of Lecce
 List of municipalities of the Province of Taranto

Basilicata
 List of municipalities of the Province of Matera
 List of municipalities of the Province of Potenza

Calabria
 List of municipalities of the Province of Catanzaro
 List of municipalities of the Province of Cosenza
 List of municipalities of the Province of Crotone
 List of municipalities of the Metropolitan City of Reggio Calabria
 List of municipalities of the Province of Vibo Valentia

Campania
 List of municipalities of the Province of Avellino
 List of municipalities of the Province of Benevento
 List of municipalities of the Province of Caserta
 List of municipalities of the Metropolitan City of Naples
 List of municipalities of the Province of Salerno

Molise
 List of municipalities of the Province of Campobasso
 List of municipalities of the Province of Isernia

Notes